The TI-1030 is a 4 function calculator first manufactured by Texas Instruments on June 11, 1978. The introductory price was $15.95. It was powered by 2 LR43 sized batteries.

References

Texas Instruments calculators